Bowerdean, Micklefield and Totteridge is a political division of Buckinghamshire County Council in Buckinghamshire, England. It is a two-seat constituency and at the last election Julia Wassell and Chaudhary Ditta, both representing the Labour Party were returned. In 2008, Julia Wassell and Chaudhary Ditta both switched their allegiance to the Liberal Democrats.

References 

 Map of wards in Buckinghamshire

BU
High Wycombe